PT Kino Indonesia Tbk, formerly PT Kinocare Era Kosmetindo, or simply known as Kino, is an Indonesian consumer goods company headquartered in Tangerang, Banten, founded in 1999 by Harry Sanusi. It specializes the manufacturing of its products in the wide range of personal care, hygiene, health care, confectionery, pastry, beverages, and pet care. As of 2022, the company is currently led by Sidharta Prawira Oetama as its president director while Sanusi act as its president commissioner.

History 
The origin of Kino Indonesia started from the small distribution company called Dutalestari Sentratama (DLS), that was founded in 1991 by Pontianak businessman Harry Sanusi, with the  capital. At the time, DLS was the sole distributor of the Three Legs Cooling Water, which manufactured and marketed by Sinde Budi Sentosa under license of Singapore-based company Wen Ken Group. However, the relationship of DLS and Sinde has strained in late 1996. In 1997, Sanusi founded Kino Sentra Industrindo (KSI) which produced candies, snacks, chocolate and the flavoured drinks. The first product that launched by KSI was Kino Candy.

With the successful achievement in the past, he established Kinocare Era Kosmetindo on 8 February 1999, that produced the wide range of personal care and hygiene products. The products were launched by Kinocare at the time, such as Ovale 2 in 1 face lotion, followed by Ellips hair care, Resik-V feminine hygiene, and Eskulin perfumes. In 2003, Kino expanded the business segment through the product diversification that specialized on baby care and household with the launch of Sleek and Sleek Baby.

In April 2011, Kino hold the license of the Three Legs Brand for Indonesian market under the agreement of Wen Ken Group, which previously handled by Sinde Budi Sentosa (which relaunched the certain products under its own "Cap Badak" branding later).

In May 2013, Kino partnered with Japanese confectionery maker Morinaga & Company to established a joint venture named Morinaga Kino Indonesia that started its operation on 1 November 2013, where Morinaga holds 51% stake and Kino holds remaining 49% stake and used the bulk of facility that originally owned by Kino Sentra Industrindo.

In September 2014, Kinocare Era Kosmetindo changed its name to Kino Indonesia as part of corporate restructuring whlist became the holding company.

Sanusi stated that the reason of Kino to acquire Ristra is that the brand implemented the rare dermatology concept which never did by its competitors before, called as "cosmeceutical and evidence based safe cosmetic", and the brand still has a great value and heritage for its consumers. As part of the acquisition, Kino also gain the control of the 12 House of Ristra clinics and seven Ristra Care Center outlets.

In November 2017, Kino established the relationship with Thai beverage company Malee Group, in order to sell the Malee-branded products in Indonesia. The companies formed three joint ventures, such as Kino Malee Indonesia, Malee Kino Company Limited and Kino Malee Trading. However, the two former companies were liquidated in June 2020 due to ingredient limitations, while Kino Malee Trading continued to operate today.

Operations 
Kino Indonesia is headquartered at the Kino Tower, in the Alam Sutera complex, located in Tangerang, Banten. In addition, it also has seven branch offices in Malaysia, Singapore, Cambodia, the Philippines, Japan, China, and Vietnam. Kino has 166 distribution networks nationwide and 40 countries internationally.

Brands

Personal care 

 Absolute
 Abstract
 B&B
 Click
 Ellips
 Eskulin
 Eskulin Kids
 Master
 Master Kids
 Ovale
 Resik-V
 Ristra
 Ristra Platinum
 Samantha
 Sasha

Household 

 Evergreen
 Instance
 Sleek
 Sleek Baby

Food and beverages 

 Cap Panda
 Chew-Chew Ball
 Frenta
 Kino
 Kino Candy
 Kino Nastar
 Larutan Penyegar Cap Kaki Tiga 
 Larutan Penyegar Cap Kaki Tiga Anak
 Malee 
 Malee Coco
 Malee Juice
 Oplozz
 Panther Energy
 Segar Sari
 Sejuk Segar
 Snackit
 Snackit Marshmallow
 Snackit Pia 100

Health care 

 Cap Kaki Tiga 
 Dua Putri Dewi
 Lola Remedios
 Q-Life

Pet care 

 MaxLife
 ProBalance
 ProDiet

References

External links 
 

Animal food manufacturers
Chemical companies established in 1999
Chemical companies of Indonesia
Companies based in Tangerang
Companies listed on the Indonesia Stock Exchange
Confectionery companies of Indonesia
Cosmetics companies
Dental companies
Food and drink companies established in 1999
Food and drink companies of Indonesia
Fragrance companies
Health care companies of Indonesia
Indonesian companies established in 1999
Manufacturing companies established in 1999
Manufacturing companies of Indonesia
Personal care companies
2015 initial public offerings